Asfyj Rural District is in Asfyj District of Behabad County, Yazd province, Iran. At the National Census of 2006, its population was 2,070 in 525 households, when it was in Behabad District of Bafq County. There were 2,127 inhabitants in 653 households at the following census of 2011, by which time the district had been elevated to the status of a county and split into two districts. At the most recent census of 2016, the population of the rural district was 2,064 in 714 households. The largest of its 61 villages was Asfyj, with 619 people.

References 

Behabad County

Rural Districts of Yazd Province

Populated places in Yazd Province

Populated places in Behabad County